Bamunanika, whose correct phonetic spelling is Baamunaanika is a town in, Luweero District in  Central Uganda.

Location
The coordinates of the town are:00 41 15N, 32 36 31E (Latitude:-0.6875; Longitude:32.6085).

Overview
Bamunanika is the hometown of Dr. John C. Muyingo, He is the current State Minister for Higher Education in the Ugandan Cabinet (2011–Present). Dr. Muyingo is the Patron of Bamunanika Constituency Education Fund (BACEF), which gives scholarships to less privileged children in Bamunanika who cannot afford school fees. Bamunanika Parliamentary Constituency consists of five sub-counties; namely: Kalagala, Zirobwe, Kikyusa, Bamunanika and Kamira.

Towns in Luweero District
Bamunanika is one of the towns in Luweero District. The other towns in the district include the following:

 Bombo
 Kalagala
 Kalule
 Wobulenzi
 Ziroobwe

Population
Bamunanika Parliamentary Constituency has a population of about 390,000 people of whom approximately 200,000 are voters. However the human population of Bamunanika Town, is not publicly known as of March 2014.

Landmarks
The landmarks within the town limits or near the town include:

 The offices of Bamunanika Town Council
 The Bamunanika Palace - One of the palaces of the Kabaka of Buganda.
 Bamunanika Central Market

See also
 Luweero District
 Kabaka of Buganda
 John Chrysostom Muyingo

References

External links

Luweero District
Populated places in Central Region, Uganda
Cities in the Great Rift Valley